The Ministry of National Housing and Social Amenities is a government ministry, responsible for housing and community infrastructure in Zimbabwe. The incumbent is Giles Mutsekwa.

Government of Zimbabwe
Zimbabwe